Janówko may refer to the following places:
Janówko, Greater Poland Voivodeship (west-central Poland)
Janówko, Kuyavian-Pomeranian Voivodeship (north-central Poland)
Janówko, Warmian-Masurian Voivodeship (north Poland)